Dad is a synonym for father in English.

Dad, DAD, or Dads may also refer to:

Places
 Dad, Hungary, a village
 Dad, Wyoming, a ghost town

People
 Dad (nickname), a list of people
 Sameer Dad (born 1978), Indian field hockey player
 Sher Mian Dad (born 1968), a Pakistani singer
 Dad Mohammad Khan (1???–2009), Member of Parliament in the National Assembly of Afghanistan

Acronyms

Computer science
 Dictionary of Algorithms and Data Structures
 Disciplined agile delivery, a decision-making framework for large-scale Agile software development projects
 Drag-and-drop, or DaD
 Duplicate Address Detection, a component of the IPv6 electronic communications protocol

Medicine
 Delayed Afterdepolarization, a type of cardiac dysrhythmia
 Diffuse alveolar damage, a histological pattern of lung disease seen in Acute Respiratory Distress Syndrome and Acute Interstitial Pneumonia
 Disinhibited attachment disorder, a psychological disorder in the ICD-10

Chemistry
 Diallyl disulfide, a constituent of garlic oil 
 1,4-Diazabutadiene, a class of diimines

Other
 Dilbilim Araştırmaları, a linguistic journal published in Turkey
 Diode array detector, a type of detector in chromatographic methods
 Texas Department of Aging and Disability Services (DADS)
 Deutscher Aufbaudienst

Film and television
 Dad (1989 film), a 1989 comedy-drama starring Jack Lemmon and Ted Danson
 Dad (2005 film), a British television film
 Dad (TV series), a former British television sitcom
 Dads (1986 TV series), an ABC series
 Dads (2013 TV series), a Fox Broadcasting Company series 
 "Dad" (Angel), a 2001 episode of the American television series Angel
 "Dad" (Red Dwarf), an unmade episode of the British television series Red Dwarf
Dad, a shortened title of the American web series Dad Feels
 Abbreviation for Die Another Day.

Music
 D-A-D, a Danish rock band formerly known as "Disneyland After Dark"
 Dads (band), an American indie rock/math rock/emo band
 Dad (A Band Called Bud album) (1989)
 Dad (Breakfast with Amy album) (1991)
 "Dad", by Meghan Trainor from the album Meghan Trainor

Brands
 Dad, a Beanie Baby teddy bear made by Ty, Inc. in 2004
 Dad's Root Beer, an American root beer

Codes
 DAD, IATA airport code for Da Nang International Airport 
 dad, ISO 639-3 code for the Marik language, spoken in Papua New Guinea

Other uses
 Ḍād (ﺽ), a letter of the Arabic alphabet
 Dad (novel), a novel by William Wharton and the basis for the 1989 film of the same name

See also

American Dad!, American animated sitcom
Father
My Two Dads, American sitcom television series